C3a may refer to:

 C3a (complement)
 C3a receptor
 , tricalcium aluminate in cement chemist notation, one of the 4 mineral phases of the Portland clinker